Porga Airport  is a public use airport located near Porga, Atakora, Benin.

References

External links 
 Airport record for Porga Airport at Landings.com

Airports in Benin
Atakora Department